Ghostpine Creek is a stream in Alberta, Canada.

The creek's name originates from an Indigenous ghost legend.

See also
List of rivers of Alberta

References

Rivers of Alberta